Aisin Gioro Yunxu (愉恪郡王 允禑; 24 December 1693 – 8 March 1731) was Kangxi Emperor's 15th surviving son and the first holder of Prince Yu of the Second Rank peerage. Due to his young age, Yunxu was not embroiled in the succession brawl among his brothers.

Life 
Yunxu was born on 24 Decomber 1693 to concubine Mi, lady Wang. He had two younger brothers, Prince Zhuangke of the First Rank Yunlu and Yinxie. Although his mother belonged to the Kangxi Emperor's favoured consorts, Yunxu was raised with the help of  Consort De. In 1708, a hand of lady Guwalgiya, daughter of Shi Wenbing and younger sister of Crown Princess, was given to Yunxu.

Court career 
Although Yunxu was related by marriage to Yunreng's primary consort and had been brought up together with Yinreng's children, he didn't affiliate himself with the Party of Crown Prince. In September 1711, Yunxu accompanied his father on the tour to imperial residences in Rehe. In December 1711, Yunxu accompanied Kangxi Emperor during the visit to the Eastern Qing tombs. In 1715, Yunxu accompanied his father on the imperial inspection tour.

He was among the princes who had reached the age of 20 (in sui) by Yongzheng Emperor's ascension to the throne. Thus, he was eligible to fight for the throne. However, Yunxu kept low profile and was sent to guard Jing mausoleum in the Eastern Qing tombs.  In 1726, Yunxu was granted a title of Prince of the Third Rank customary for imperial sons. In 1731, Yunxu was promoted to the Prince of the Second Rank under the honorific name "Yu" (愉).

Death and succession 
Yunxu died on 8 March 1731 and was posthumously honoured as Prince Yuke of the Second Rank. He was succeeded by the eldest son, Hongqing.

Family 
Yunxu was married to lady Guwalgiya, daughter of Shi Wenbing (石文炳) and younger sister of Yunreng's wife.

Primary Consort

 Primary consort, of the Gūwalgiya clan (嫡福晋 瓜尔佳氏), daughter of Wenbing
 Second daughter (14 October 1716 – 31 March 1726)

Secondary Consort

 Secondary consort, of the Gūwalgiya clan (侧福晋 瓜尔佳氏), daughter of Bose (博色)
 First daughter (22 March 1716 — February/March 1717)
 First son (25 March 1718 – 27 November 1719)
 Second son (30 September 1719 – 20 August 1720)
 Third daughter (30 September 1722 – 23 September 1730)
 Lady of the Second Rank (县君; 30 September 1722 – 3 January 1745), fourth daughter
 Married Dondob Dorji (敦多布多尔济) of the Dinghao Borjigin clan
 Prince Yugong of the Second Rank Hongqing (愉恭郡王 弘庆; 4 September 1724 – 19 January 1770), third son
 Hongshou (弘绶; 5 November 1727 – 17 December 1731), fifth son
 Fifth daughter (23 October 1729 – 1748)

Concubine

 Mistress, of the Du clan (庶福晋 杜氏)
 Third class defender general Hongfu (三等镇国将军 弘富; 27 April 1727 – 12 October 1783), fourth son

References 

Qing dynasty imperial princes
Prince Yu (愉)
Kangxi Emperor's sons